Yulia Lisnik (born 1 August 1966) is a retired Moldovan race walker.

She finished 26th at the 1993 World Championships and 22nd at the 1994 European Championships, both times in the 10 kilometre distance.

Achievements

References

1966 births
Living people
Moldovan racewalkers
Moldovan female athletes
Female racewalkers
World Athletics Championships athletes for Moldova